Hertzsprung is an enormous lunar impact crater, or impact basin, that is located on the far side of the Moon, beyond the western limb. In dimension, this formation is larger than several of the lunar mare areas on the near side. It lies in the northwestern fringe of the blast radius of the Mare Orientale impact basin. Nearby craters of note include Michelson across the northeast rim, Vavilov across the western rim, and Lucretius to the southeast.

The outer rim of Hertzsprung has been damaged and modified by several notable impacts (mentioned above) and a number of smaller craters. A chain of small craters, designated Catena Lucretius,  begins at the southeastern outer rim and proceeds toward the west-northwest until it connects with the perimeter of the inner basin. This inner area is less rough than the outer ring of the floor, and is surrounded by a circular range of ridges. The inner perimeter is also pierced by several craters, including Hertzsprung D along the eastern portion and Hertzsprung S on the western side. Nor is the interior of the inner basin free from impacts, including K, H, X, and L, listed in the table below.

At the center of the basin is a mass concentration (mascon), or gravitational high.  The mascon was first identified by Doppler tracking of the Lunar Prospector spacecraft.

The equator of the Moon passes through this formation, being located to the south of the midpoint and cutting through the central basin.

Satellite craters
By convention these features are identified on lunar maps by placing the letter on the side of the crater midpoint that is closest to Hertzsprung.

2022 Long March 3C third stage impact

In February 2022, after a mis-identification, it was announced that a Long March 3C third stage from the 2014 Chang'e 5 T1 mission, should have crashed in or near the crater on 4 March 2022, 12:25:58 UTC, at latitude +5.18, east longitude 233.55, plus or minus a few seconds and a few kilometers. Confirmation of the impact could be acquired through satellites like the LRO. The event showed how hard it is to track small objects in deep space. 

In June 2022 NASA released a picture of the crater produced by the purported rocket body. Unusually it is a double lobed crater. Previous craters created by rocket bodies on the Moon have been large single craters. It was found near the Hertzsprung D crater at coordinates (5.226 degrees north, 234.486 degrees east, 1,863 meters elevation).

References

 
 
 
 
 
 
 
 
 
 
 
 

Impact craters on the Moon